Screamin' for My Supper is the second studio album by American singer/songwriter Beth Hart. It was released on August 3, 1999, by Atlantic Records. The album features her most notable single to date, "LA Song (Out of This Town)", which was a number one hit in New Zealand and a Top 5 hit on the US Adult Contemporary Singles Chart. The album peaked at #143 on the Billboard albums chart in the US; and #22 on the RIANZ albums chart in New Zealand. "Delicious Surprise" was later recorded by Jo Dee Messina on her 2005 album of the same name, from which it was released as a single.

Track listing

Personnel

Primary musicians
 Beth Hart – arranger, artwork, composer, concept design, design, Fender Rhodes, keyboards, orchestral arrangements, paintings, piano, producer, vocals
 Tristan Avakian – guitar
 Rocco Bidlovski – drums
 Tal Herzberg – bass, engineer, mixing, producer, programming
 Jimmy Khoury – guitar
 Matt Laug – drums
 Oliver Leiber – bass, drum programming, guitar, producer, programming
 Lance Morrison – bass
 David Raven – drums
 Patrick Warren – accordion, chamberlin, harmonium
 John Shanks – guitar

Additional musicians
 Yolanda Adams – backing vocals
 Luis Conte – percussion
 Kirstin Fife – strings
 Elaine Gibbs – backing vocals
 Aaron Gross – percussion
 Jeff Lorber – keyboards
 Gina Kronstadt – strings
 Novi Novog – strings
 Benmont Tench – Hammond synth, keyboards, Hammond organ, piano
 Chris Hammer Smith – harmonica

Other credits
 Jennifer Barbato – art direction, design, logo design
 Joe Barresi – engineer
 Jason Flom – direction
 Jaymes Foster-Levy – direction, director
 Larry Frazin – direction, director
 John Gyer – assistant engineer
 Donovan Hebard – coordination
 Chris Lord-Alge – mixing
 Stephen Marcussen – mastering
 Nick Marshall – assistant engineer, mixing, mixing assistant
 John A. Pinsky – design, logo design
 Dave Reitzas – mixing
 Jill Rose – artist development
 Barry Rudolph – engineer
 Patrick Seymour – arranger, string arrangements
 Tracy Sondern – make-up
 Andrew Southam – photography
 Dan Steinberg – assistant engineer
 Greg Sutton – composer
 Bob Thiele – composer
 Eric "ET" Thorngren – engineer
 Diane Wiedenmann – hair stylist
 David Wolff – management
 Basia Zamorska – stylist

Charts

References

1999 albums
Beth Hart albums
Atlantic Records albums